is a Japanese voice actor and narrator. He belongs to Sigma Seven.

His representative works are Hozuki's Coolheadedness (Hozuki), Bleach (Yasutora Sado), Shin Hodo 2001 (narration), Hetalia: Axis Powers (Germany), and Super Soccer (narration).

Filmography

Television animation

OVA

ONA

Animated films

Drama CD roles

1-en no Otoko  (Kijima)
Ai no Kotoba mo Shiranaide (Retsu Sonekawa)
Bad Boys! (youth 1)
Boku no Senpai (Saburo Ninomiya)
Chocolate no Youni (Kajimoto)
Critical Lovers (Takatou Shinobu)
Danshi Meiro (Masami Oonuki)
DeadLock series (Dick Burnford)
Elektel Delusion/ Mousou Erekiteru (Motoki Fumihiro)
Gomennasai to Ittemiro (Tougo Kuguno)
Goshujinsama to Inu (Kazusa Gaiou)
Hetalia: Axis Powers (Germany)
Hitorijime Theory (Takao)
Kichiku Megane Hisouchaku Ban I & II (Honda Kenji)
Kichiku Megane Souchaku Ban I & II (Honda Kenji)
Kindan Vampire Vol. 3 (Rudolf)
Konna Otoko wa Aisareru (Retsu Sonekawa)
Kuroi Ryuu wa Nido Chikau (Jade)
Kuroshitsuji (Agni)
Monthly Girls' Nozaki-kun (Umetarō Nozaki)
Nejireta Edge (Yamaoka)
Netsujou no Ori de Nemure (Souichirou Oomaru)
Pretty Babies (Yuri Ibuki)
Saezuru Tori wa Habatakanai – Kageyama
Saint Seiya Episode.G (Pontos)
Seikimatsu Tantei Club (John H Watson)
Shuukan Soine vol. 2 (Jin)
Toukasei Renai Souchi (Kazumi Makita)
Usagigari (Munetsugu Kanou)
Wakakusa Monogatari ~Kami Hikouki ni Notte~ (Hannah)
Wasurenaide Itekure (Michiya Hatano)
Yatamomo (Suda)
Yuuwaku Recipe (Miura)
Yuuwaku - Temptation (Yanase)

Tokusatsu
Tensou Sentai Goseiger (2010) (Garyusu Alien Yuzeikusu of the Ice & Snow (ep. 3))
Ultraman Retsuden (2012) (Alien Mefilas Sly of the Dark Magic)
Ultra Zero Fight (2012) (Alien Mefilas Sly of the Dark Magic)
Tokumei Sentai Go-Busters (2012) (Loupeloid (ep. 41))
Zyuden Sentai Kyoryuger vs. Go-Busters: The Great Dinosaur Battle! Farewell Our Eternal Friends (2014) (Neo-Grifforzer)
Ultraman Orb (2016) (Alien Mefilas Nostra (ep. 6, 9 - 10))
Kaitou Sentai Lupinranger VS Keisatsu Sentai Patranger (2018) (Narration)
Ultra Galaxy Fight: The Destined Crossroad (2022) (Absolute Titan)

Video games

Animamundi: Dark Alchemist (2004) - Mephistopheles
Mega Man Battle Network 5: Double Team DS (2004) - Colonel
Bleach: Shattered Blade (2006) - Yasutora "Chad" Sado
Warriors Orochi (2007) - Fu Xi
Hetalia Academy (2007) - Germany
Guilty Gear 2: Overture (2007) - Raven
Warriors Orochi 2 (2008) - Fu Xi
Guilty Gear XX Accent Core Plus (2008) - Raven/Crow
Death Connection (2009) - Gloria
Halo Wars (2009) - Sergeant John Forge
Beast Master and Prince (2010) - Klaus
Dynasty Warriors: Strikeforce 2 (2010) - Fu Xi
Summon Night Granthese: Sword of Ruin and the Knight's Promise (2010) - Hilgis
Super Street Fighter IV - Guile
Last Ranker (2010) - Tylong
Storm Lover (2010) - Tsukasa Sugai
Harukanaru Toki no Naka de 5 (2011) - Shinsaku Takasugi 
2nd Super Robot Wars Z: Hakai Hen (2011) - Aim Liard
Fairy Tail Gekitotsu! Kardia Daiseidou (2011) - Elfman Strauss
Storm Lover: Summer Love!! (2011) - Tsukasa Sugai
Deus Ex: Human Revolution (2011) - Adam Jensen 
Warriors Orochi 3 (2011) - Fu Xi
Asura's Wrath (2012) - Asura
Beast Master and Prince: Snow Bride (2012) - Klaus
Legasista (2012) - Shout
2nd Super Robot Wars Z: Saisei Hen (2012) - Aim Liard
Chaos Rings II (2012) - Araki
Resident Evil: Operation Raccoon City (2012) - Carlos Oliveira
Fairy Tail: Zeref's Awakening (2012) - Elfman Strauss
Grimm the Bounty Hunter (2012) - Bremen March
BlazBlue: Chrono Phantasma (2012) - Azrael
Naruto Shippuden: Ultimate Ninja Storm 3 (2013) - Han
Horizon in the Middle of Nowhere Portable (2013) - Takakane Hironaka
JoJo's Bizarre Adventure: All Star Battle (2013) - Ringo Roadagain
Sword Art Online: Infinity Moment (2013) - Agil
Dragon's Crown (2013) - Wizard
Conception II: Children of the Seven Stars (2013) - Rhiod
Storm Lover 2nd (2013) - Tsukasa Sugai
The Legend of Heroes: Trails of Cold Steel (2013) - Victor S. Arseid
Warriors Orochi 3 Ultimate (2013) - Fu Xi
Yakuza Ishin! (2014) - Harada Sanosuke
Super Robot Wars UX (2013) - Kan-u Gundam
Ultra Street Fighter IV (2014) - Guile
Sword Art Online: Hollow Fragment (2014) - Agil
Naruto Shippuden: Ultimate Ninja Storm Revolution (2014) - Han
The Legend of Heroes: Trails of Cold Steel II (2014) - Victor S. Arseid
BlazBlue: Chronophantasma Extend (2014) - Azrael
God Eater 2 Rage Burst (2015) - Isaac Feldman
Harukanaru Toki no Naka de 6 (2015) - Murasame Satoya
Sword Art Online: Lost Song (2015) - Agil
Guilty Gear Xrd -REVELATOR- (2015) - Raven
Arslan: The Warriors of Legend (2015) - Kishward
BlazBlue: Central Fiction (2015) - Azrael
Naruto Shippuden: Ultimate Ninja Storm 4 (2016) - Han
Sword Art Online: Hollow Realization (2016) - Agil
Super Smash Bros. Ultimate (2018) - Guile
The Thousand Musketeers (2018) - Eins
Ace Combat 7: Skies Unknown (2019) - Matias Torres

Dubbing roles

Live-action

Animation

Narration
Drain the Oceans (Season 3, episodes 6 to 10)

References

External links
Official agency profile 
 
 

1977 births
Male voice actors from Yamaguchi Prefecture
Japanese male video game actors
Japanese male voice actors
Living people
Komazawa University alumni
21st-century Japanese male actors